

Events

February events
 February – The Chesterfield Railroad, the first railroad built in Virginia is chartered.

March events 
 March 24 – Pennsylvania's first state-owned railway, the Philadelphia and Columbia Railway, is authorized by the state legislature.

July events 
 July 4 – Construction begins on the Baltimore and Ohio Railroad in Baltimore, Maryland, when Charles Carroll of Carrollton lays the first stone for the Carrollton Viaduct, the first stone masonry railroad bridge in the United States.

August events 
 August 1 – The Bolton and Leigh Railway opens to freight traffic.
 August 27 – The  Andrézieux-Roanne line is authorized in France.

October events 
 October 1 – The first public railway in France is formally opened from Saint-Étienne to Andrézieux. It is horse-worked and initially carries freight traffic only.

Unknown date events
 The Hudson and Berkshire Railroad is chartered to build a railroad between Chatham, New York, and Hudson, New York.

Births

October births
 October 30 – Horatio G. Brooks, founder of Brooks Locomotive Works (d. 1887).

Deaths

References